Peponapis is a genus of bees belonging to the family Apidae.

The species of this genus are found in America.

Species:

Peponapis apiculata 
Peponapis atrata 
Peponapis azteca 
Peponapis citrullina 
Peponapis crassidentata 
Peponapis fervens 
Peponapis limitaris 
Peponapis melonis 
Peponapis michelbacherorum 
Peponapis pacifica 
Peponapis parkeri 
Peponapis pruinosa 
Peponapis smithi 
Peponapis timberlakei 
Peponapis utahensis

References

Apidae
Bee genera